The Battle of San Juan (1595) was a Spanish victory during the Anglo–Spanish War. This war broke out in 1585 and was fought not only in the European theatre but in Spain's American colonies. After emerging from six years of disgrace following the resounding defeat of the English Armada at Lisbon in 1589, Francis Drake embarked on a long and disastrous campaign against the Spanish Main, suffering several consecutive defeats there. On 22 November 1595 Drake and John Hawkins tried to invade San Juan, Puerto Rico with 27 ships and 2,500 men. After failing to be able to land at the Ensenada del Escambron on the eastern end of San Juan Islet, he attempted to sail into San Juan Bay with the intention of sacking the city. Unable to capture the island, following the death of his comrade, John Hawkins, Drake abandoned San Juan, and set sail for Panama where he died from disease and received a burial at sea after failing to establish an English settlement in America.

Background
Queen Elizabeth I of England sent Sir Francis Drake and Sir John Hawkins on an expedition against the Spanish stronghold of Puerto Rico and Panama, in an attempt to strike a blow against the source of Spain's gold and silver. They set sail from Plymouth on 28 August 1595, with a fleet of 27 ships and 2,500 men. Previous to that, the Spanish West Indian Fleet under the command of General Sancho Pardo Osorio  had sailed from Havana on 10 March with 2,000,000 pesos in gold and silver, bound for Spain. Damage from a storm in the Bermuda Channel five days later necessitated a trip to Puerto Rico for repairs, which was reached on 9 April. The treasure cargo was placed in La Fortaleza for safekeeping while repairs were undertaken. Admiral Pedro Tello de Guzmán, commanding five frigates, was sent to retrieve the treasure. Along the way to Puerto Rico, Tello captured one of Drake's ships, the Francis, near Guadeloupe, upon which he learned of Drake's mission, and hastened to Puerto Rico ahead of Drake.

Battle
General Sancho took command of the shore defences, Admiral Gonzalo Mendez de Cauzo commanded the forts, while Tello defended the harbour with his frigates. The Spanish decided to sink two vessels at the harbour entrance, with Tello's frigates just behind, to prevent the English from entering the harbour. The Spanish defence consisted of 1500 men, 800 of whom manned the 5 frigates, with 70 land-based cannon in addition to those on the frigates. Hawkins had died on 12 November from a fever, while Drake arrived offshore Puerto Rico on 22 November, anchoring off the Boquerón Inlet. The Spanish artillery and scored hits upon Drake's ship, Defiance, killing Sir Nicholas Clifford and Browne.  Drake moved his fleet to the vicinity of Isla de Cabras on 23 November.

According to a Spanish account,

On 25 Nov., Drake's fleet gave up the fight and departed.

Aftermath

The Spanish treasure fleet finally left Puerto Rico on 20 Dec. 1595, bound for Spain.

This defeat ended English hopes of establishing a presence in the Caribbean Sea. After an attempt to cross the Isthmus of Panama in January 1596 also ended in defeat, Drake succumbed to dysentery and on 28 January he would die.

Popular Culture
The battle is mentioned in Lope de Vega's epic poem La Dragontea.

References

Additional Reading
 
 

Colonial Puerto Rico
Conflicts in 1595
Anglo-Spanish War (1585–1604)
Puerto Rico
Old San Juan, Puerto Rico
16th century in Puerto Rico
16th century in the Caribbean
1595 in Central America
1595 in the Caribbean
1595 in the British Empire
1595 in the Spanish Empire
History of San Juan, Puerto Rico